Me, Grandma, Iliko and Ilarioni ( translit. Me, bebia, iliko da ilarioni) is a 1962 Georgian black-and-white Social-themed Comedy-drama film directed by Tengiz Abuladze based on a novel of same name by Nodar Dumbadze.

Cast
Soso Ordjonikidze
Sesilia Takaishvili
Aleqsandre Jorjoliani
Grigol Tkabladze
Manana Abazadze
Kira Andronikashvili
Tengiz Daushvili
Ioseb Gogichaishvili
Shalva Kherkheulidze
Aleqsandre Gomelauri

References

External links
 

Georgian-language films
1962 films
1962 comedy-drama films
Soviet black-and-white films
Films directed by Tengiz Abuladze
1962 comedy films
1962 drama films
Soviet comedy-drama films
Comedy-drama films from Georgia (country)
Soviet-era films from Georgia (country)